Peter Riegel (1935-2018) was an American research engineer who developed a mathematical formula for predicting race times for runners and other athletes given a certain performance at another distance. The formula has been widely adopted on account of its simplicity and predictive accuracy.

Career
Riegel gained a BS in mechanical engineering from Purdue University in 1959 and his masters from Villanova University in 1966.

He was a research engineer at Battelle Memorial Institute in Columbus, Ohio, researching the development of deep-sea diving equipment as well as air flow in coal mines. He published numerous  articles on waste-water treatment, underwater life support, motorcycle mechanics and distance running.

Riegel founded and edited Measurement News, the newsletter of the Road Running Technical Council of USA Track & Field. He helped in the creation of the RRTC when USATF was first being organized, and served as its chairman until 2002. He headed the US team to design and measure the marathon courses for the 1984 and 1996 U.S. Olympics, as well as the U.S. Men's Olympic Marathon Trials race held in Columbus in 1992. He was also a founding member of the Association of Road Racing Statisticians.

He held a patent for an automatic trip fill nozzle and another for an exhaust regulator valve for push-pull diving system.

Race time prediction
In a 1977 article for Runner's World Magazine, Riegel proposed a simple formula for comparing relative performances at different distances.  The formula is most commonly quoted as:
T2=T1×(D2÷D1)1.06

Riegel expanded on his thesis in a 1981 article for American Scientist, stating that the formula t=axb concerns activities in the "endurance range", namely lasting between 3.5 and 230 minutes. The analysis deals with running, swimming and walking.

The simplicity of the formula and its predictive accuracy has resulted in it being adopted widely by websites such as Runner's World.  Some sites have modified it, stating that the value of 1.06 given for the exponent b in the formula results in seemingly unachievable predictions for longer distances.

Publications

References

American mechanical engineers
Purdue University College of Engineering alumni
Villanova University alumni
Year of birth missing (living people)
Place of birth missing (living people)
People from Columbus, Ohio
Living people
Engineers from Ohio